Moa Island may refer to:

Moa (island), Indonesia
Moa Island (Queensland)